The following is a list of all the compositions by Italian composer Salvatore Sciarrino.

Works by genre

Stage works
Amore e Psiche (1973)
Aspern (1979)
Cailles en sarcophage. Atti per un museo delle ossessioni (1979–1980)
Vanitas. Natura morta in un atto (1981)
Lohengrin. Azione invisibile per solista (1982–1984)
La perfezione di uno spirito sottile (1985)
Perseo e Andromeda (1990)
Luci mie traditrici (1996–1998)
Infinito nero. Estasi in un atto (1998)
Morte a Venezia. Studi sullo spessore lineare (1991)
Macbeth. Tre atti senza nome (2002)
Lohengrin 2. Disegno per un giardino sonoro (2004)
Da gelo a gelo (Kälte) (2006)
La porta della legge - quasi un monologo circolare (2006–2008)
Superflumina (2010)

Symphonic works
 Berceuse (1969)
 Da a da da (1970)
 Introduzione e Aria "Ancora il duplice" (1971)
 Grande Sonata da camera (1972)
 Rondo (1972)
 Romanza (1973)
 Variazioni (1974)
 Clair de lune (1976)
 Il paese senz'alba (1977)
 Il paese senza tramonto (1977)
 Berceuse variata (1977)
 Kindertotenlied (1978)
 Musiche per "All'uscita" (1978)
 Che sai, guardiano della notte? (1979)
 Un'immagine di Arpocrate (1979)
 Flos, forum (1981)
 Efebo con radio (1981)
 Autoritratto nella notte (1982)
 Allegoria della notte (1985)
 Sui poemi concentrici I, II, III (1987)
 Morte di Borromini (1988)
 Gioachino Rossini: Giovanna d'Arco (1989. Orchestration of an original Rossini composition, a cantata written in 1832 with piano accompaniment)
 Lettura da lontano (1989)
 Nove Canzoni del XX secolo (1991)
 Cadenzario (1991)
 Frammento e Adagio (1992)
 Musiche per il "Paradiso" di Dante (1993)
 Mozart a 9 anni (1993)
 Soffio e forma (1995)
 L'immaginazione a se stessa (1996)
 Il cerchio tagliato dei suoni (1997)
 I fuochi oltre la ragione (1997)	
 La bocca, i piedi, il suono (1997)
 Quattro intermezzi (1997)
 Sophisticated Lady (1999)
 Recitativo oscuro (1999)
 Studi per l'intonazione del mare (2000)
 Il clima dopo Harry Partch (2000)
 Il giornale della necropoli (2000)
 Altre schegge di canto (2002)
 Graffito sul mare (2003)
 Il suono e il tacere (2004)
 Storie di altre storie (2005)
 Shadow of sound (2005)
 4 Adagi (2007)
 Libro notturno delle voci (2009)
 Senza sale d'aspetto (2011)

Choral music and music for vocal ensembles
 Musiche per "Orlando furioso" (1969)
 Musiche per "I bei colloqui" (1970)
 Musiche per "Le Trachinie" (1980)
 Le donne di Trachis (1980)
 Tutti i miraggi delle acque (1987)
 L'alibi della parola (1994)
 3 Canti senza pietre (1999)
 Responsorio delle tenebre (2001)
 12 Madrigali (2007)

Chamber music
 Sonata per due pianoforti (1966)
 II Quartetto (1967)
 Aka aka to I, II, III (1968)
 6 Ricercari di Antonio il Verso (1969)
 2 Mottetti di Anonimi (1969)
 ... da un Divertimento (1970)
 In memoriam (1970)
 Arabesque (1971)
 Sonata da camera (1971)
 Sonatina per violino e pianoforte (1975)
 Danse for 2 violins and viola (1975)
 Siciliano (1975)
 Trio (1975)
 Di Zefiro e Pan (1976)
 Quintettino n. 1 (1976)
 Quintettino n. 2 (1977)
 12 canzoni da battello (1977)
 Canzona da battello (1977)
 Attraverso i cancelli (1977)
 Due melodie (1978)
 Aspern Suite (1979)
 D'un faune (1980)
 Fauno che fischia a un merlo (1980)
 La malinconia for violin and viola (1980)
 5 scene da Cailles en sarcophage (1980)
 Blue Dream (1980)
 Introduzione all'oscuro (1981)
 Canto degli specchi (1981)
 Vanitas (1981)
 Melencolia I (1982)
 Due nuove melodie (1982)
 Nox apud Orpheum (1982)
 Codex purpureus (1983)
 Tre canzoni del XX secolo (1984)
 Raffigurar Narciso al fonte (1984)
 Codex purpureus II (1984)
 Centauro marino for clarinet, violin, viola, cello and piano (1984)
 Guillaume de Machaut: "Rose Liz" (1984)
 Il tempo con l'obelisco (1985)
 La navigazione notturna (1985)
 Lo spazio inverso (1985)
 La perfezione di uno spirito sottile (1985)
 Esplorazione del bianco II (1986)
 Le ragioni delle conchiglie (1986)
 Trio n. 2 (1987)
 Il motivo degli oggetti di vetro (1987)
 Brazil (L'épigraphe phénicienne du) (1988)
 Il silenzio degli oracoli (1989)
 Sei quartetti brevi (1992)
 W. A. Mozart: Adagio (1994)
 Medioevo presente (1994)
 Nuvolario (1995)
 Omaggio a Burri (1995)
 Muro d'orizzonte (1997)
 Due risvegli e il vento (1997)
 Waiting for the wind (1998)
 Le voci sottovetro (1998)
 Pagine (1998)
 Canzoniere da Scarlatti (1998)
 Cantare con silenzio (1999)
 Quartetto n. 7 (1999)
 Un fruscìo lungo trent'anni (1999)
 Esercizi di tre stili (2000)
 2 Arie notturne dal campo (2001)
 In nomine nominis (2001)
 La perfidia (2002)
 Cavatina e i gridi (2002)
 Allegro KV 15 (2003)
 Due smarrimenti (2003)
 Sestetto (2003)
 Quaderno di strada (2003)
 Scena di vento (2004)
 Il legno e la parola (2004)
 Vento d'ombra (2005)
 Archeologia del telefono (2005)
 Tre duetti con l'eco (2006)
 Dita unite a quattro mani (2006)
 Le stagioni artificiali (2006)
 12 Madrigali (2007)
 Quartetto n. 8 (2008)
 Il giardino di Sara (2008)
 Adagio (2009)
 L'altro giardino (2009)
 Adagio di Mozart (2010)
 Fanofania (2010)
 Cantiere del poema (2011)

Music for a solo instrument
 Minifuga (1965)
 Prélude pour le piano (1969)
 De o de do [harpsichord](1970)
 De la nuit [piano] (1971)
 Esercizio [piano] (1972)
 Due Studi (1974)	
 Tre notturni brillanti for viola solo (1974)	
 Per Mattia [violin] (1975)
 Toccata [flute?] (1975)
 Etude de concert [piano] (1976)
 Sei Capricci [violin] (1976)
 I Sonata per pianoforte (1976)	
 All'aure in una lontananza [flute] (1977)
 Ai limiti della notte for viola (or cello) solo (1979)
 L'addio a Trachis [harp] (1980)
 Anamorfosi [piano] (1980)
 Cadenze e fermate (Mozart - pianoforte) (1982)
 Let me die before I wake [clarinet] (1982)
 II Sonata per pianoforte [piano] (1983)
 Morgana (1983)
 Hermes [flute] (1984)	
 Come vengono prodotti gli incantesimi? [flute] (1985)
 Canzona di ringraziamento [flute] (1985)
 Esplorazione del bianco I [double bass] (1986)	
 Appendice alla perfezione [percussion] (1986)	
 Esplorazione del bianco III (1986)
 III Sonata per pianoforte (1987)
 L'addio a Trachis II [harp] (1987)
 Cadenze (Mozart - violino) (1989)
 Cadenze e fermate (Mozart - flauto e oboe) (1989)
 Venere che le Grazie la fioriscono [flute] (1989)
 L'orizzonte luminoso di Aton [flute] (1989)
 Fra i testi dedicati alle nubi [flute] (1989)
 Variazione su uno spazio ricurvo [piano] (1990)
 Fermate e fioriture (1990)
 Perduto in una città d'acque [piano] (1991)	
 Cadenze (Mozart - pianoforte) (1991)	
 IV Sonata per pianoforte (1992)
 Fermata e Cadenza (Boccherini) (1993)
 Johann Sebastian Bach: Toccata e fuga in re minore (1993)
 Addio case del vento [flute] (1993)
 V Sonata con 5 finali diversi (1994)
 Polveri laterali [piano] (1997)
 Vagabonde blu [accordion] (1998)
 Notturno n. 3 [piano] (1998)	
 2 Notturni per pianoforte [piano] (1998)	
 Notturno n. 4 [piano] (1998)
 L'orologio di Bergson [flute] (1999)	
 Morte tamburo [flute] (1999)	
 Immagine fenicia [flute] (2000)
 Lettera degli antipodi portata dal vento [flute] (2000)	
 Due notturni crudeli [piano] (2001)
 Capriccio di una corda [violin] (2009)
 Fra sé [violin] (2009)

Cadenzas, fiorituras, re-elaborations
 Blue Dream (1980)
 Cadenze e fermate (Mozart - pianoforte) (1982)
 Brazil (L'épigraphe phénicienne du) (1988)
 Cadenze (Mozart - violino) (1989)
 Cadenze e fermate (Mozart - flauto e oboe) (1989)
 Gioachino Rossini: Giovanna d'Arco (1989)
 Fermate e fioriture (1990)
 Morte a Venezia (1991)
 Nove Canzoni del XX secolo (1991)
 Cadenze (Mozart - pianoforte) (1991)
 Cadenzario (1991)
 Fermata e Cadenza (Boccherini) (1993)
 Johann Sebastian Bach, Toccata e fuga in re minore (1993)
 Mozart a 9 anni (1993)
 W. A. Mozart, Adagio (1994)
 Medioevo presente (1994)
 Le voci sottovetro (1998)
 Canzoniere da Scarlatti (1998)
 Sophisticated Lady (1999)
 Esercizi di tre stili (2000)
 2 Arie notturne dal campo (2001)
 Allegro KV 15 (2003)
 Adagio (2009)
 Adagio di Mozart (2010)

Music for the stage and music for radio broadcasts
 Musiche per Orlando furioso (1969)
 Musiche per I bei colloqui (1970)
 Musiche per All'uscita (1978)
 Musiche per Le Trachinie (1980)
 Musiche per Lectura Dantis (1981)
 La voce dell'Inferno (1981)
 Prologo in terra (1985)
 Musiche per La Divina Commedia (1988)
 Musiche per il Paradiso di Dante (1993)
 Terribile e spaventosa storia… (1999)

Electronic music
 Musiche per I bei colloqui (1970)
 Implicor (1971)
 La voce dell'Inferno (1981)
 Due Arie marine (1990)
 Nom des Airs (1994)
 Lohengrin 2 (2004)

References 

http://salvatoresciarrino.eu/Data/Catalogo/Cat_crono_ita.html
https://web.archive.org/web/20110717015716/http://www.raitrade.it/misc/Sciarrino2008.pdf
http://www.ricordi.it/cms/compositori/s/salvatore-sciarrino
 

Sciarrino